is a railway station in the town of Watari, Miyagi, Japan, operated by East Japan Railway Company (JR East).

Lines

Station layout
The station has two opposed side platforms connected to the station building by a footbridge. The station is staffed.

History
It was renamed Hamayoshida on June 1, 1915. The station was absorbed into the JR East network upon the privatization of Japanese National Railways (JNR) on April 1, 1987. Following severe damage in the 2011 Tōhoku earthquake and tsunami, operations on the Joban Line between Hamayoshida Station and Soma Station were suspended until December 10, 2016.

Passenger statistics
In fiscal 2018, the station was used by an average of 504 passengers daily (boarding passengers only).

Surrounding area
 Hamayoshida Post Office

See also
 List of railway stations in Japan

References

External links

  

Railway stations in Miyagi Prefecture
Jōban Line
Railway stations in Japan opened in 1897
Watari, Miyagi